Saint-Julien is a municipality located in the Municipalité régionale de comté des Appalaches in Quebec, Canada. It is part of the Chaudière-Appalaches region and the population is 376 as of 2016. It is named after Julien-Melchior Bernier, the first reverend of the parish between 1856 and 1863.

References

External links

Commission de toponymie du Québec
Ministère des Affaires municipales, des Régions et de l'Occupation du territoire

Municipalities in Quebec
Incorporated places in Chaudière-Appalaches